Archis may refer to:
 Archi people
 Archis, Armenia
 Archiș, a commune in Arad County, Romania